Indofood Agri Resources Ltd. (shortened as IndoAgri) is an investment holding company and a subsidiary of . Through Anthoni Salim's First Pacific and Indofood, he owns 74% of the company's voting rights. The company is listed on Singapore Exchange (ticker: 5JS) and the Frankfurt Stock Exchange (ticker: ZVF).

Operations
IndoAgri operates in Indonesia, Brazil and Philippines.

Controversy
In 2019, IndoAgri quit its membership from the Roundtable on Sustainable Palm Oil after it had struggled with the RSPO complaints. According to Chain Reaction Research, 42% of IndoAgri's landbank is contested, community conflicts are happening on several plantations have and some land is within protected nature area.

References

Companies listed on the Singapore Exchange
Palm oil production in Indonesia
Agriculture companies of Singapore
Agriculture companies established in 2001